The 1986 Rhode Island gubernatorial election was held on November 4, 1986. Incumbent Republican Edward D. DiPrete defeated Democratic nominee Bruce Sundlun with 64.70% of the vote.

Primary elections
Primary elections were held on September 9, 1986.

Democratic primary

Candidates
Bruce Sundlun, businessman
Steve White

Results

General election

Candidates
Major party candidates
Edward D. DiPrete, Republican 
Bruce Sundlun, Democratic

Other candidates
Robert J. Healey, Independent
Tony Affigne, Independent

Results

References

1986
Rhode Island